Germantown is an unincorporated community in O'Brien County, Iowa, United States.

History
Germantown was platted on June 10, 1901. Edward D. Beerman did the platting. Germantown's population was 53 in 1902.

It in the 1910s had a Christian school. The community was home to K-8th grade St. John Lutheran school, before it merged with Zion Lutheran School in Paullina to form Zion - St. John Lutheran School. By 1925, Germantown's population was 55.

Germantown is home to The Hideout, a small local bar.

Education
South O'Brien Community School District operates schools serving the community. The district was formed on July 1, 1993, by the merger of three school districts: Paullina, Primghar, and Sutherland.

References

Populated places in O'Brien County, Iowa
Unincorporated communities in Iowa